Francisco Dumetz (died 14 January 1811) was a Spanish Franciscan missionary. He gave the San Bernardino Valley in California its name, in 1810.

Life
He was a native of Majorca, Spain, where he entered the Franciscan Order. In May, 1770, he went to Mexico with forty-eight other Franciscans to join the Franciscan missionary college of San Fernando in Mexico City.

On volunteering for the Indian missions, he was sent to California in October, 1770. Sailing from San Blas, Jalisco, with ten friars in January, 1771, he reached Monterey in May and was assigned to Mission San Diego. In May, 1772, he was transferred to Mission San Carlos Borromeo de Carmelo, and in May, 1782, was appointed for Mission San Buenaventura.

There he continued his mission work until August, 1797, when he was directed to found Mission San Fernando. Father Dumetz remained there from its founding on 8 September to the end of 1805, except during 1803 and 1804 when apparently he resided at San Gabriel.

From January, 1806, to the time of his death, Father Dumetz was stationed at San Gabriel. His remains were buried in the mission church on 15 January. Dumetz was the last of the pioneer friars in California, where he worked without interruption for forty years.

Places Named After Dumetz
 Point Dume was a result of a misspelling of Dumetz's name.
 Dumetz Road in the San Fernando Valley.
 Dumetz street in Toulon (quartier Serinette) - Var - France

References
Palou, Noticias (San Francisco, 1874), 1; 
, Vida del Fray Junipero Serra (Mexico, 1787), Records of Missions, San Carlos San Buenaventura, San Fernando, San Gabriel; 
Engelhardt, Zephyrin The Franciscans in California (Harbor Springs, Mich., 1897).
Sixty Five More Los Angeles Placenames

Notes

External links
Catholic Encyclopedia article

18th-century births
1811 deaths
People from Mallorca
Spanish Franciscans
18th-century Spanish Roman Catholic priests
19th-century American Roman Catholic priests
Spanish Roman Catholic missionaries
History of San Bernardino County, California
Roman Catholic missionaries in New Spain